"Magnificent desolation" is a phrase Buzz Aldrin used to describe the Moon surface during the Apollo 11 mission.

It may refer to:

 Magnificent Desolation (book), an autobiography by Buzz Aldrin
 Magnificent Desolation: Walking on the Moon 3D, a 2005 IMAX 3D documentary film